The following lists events that happened during 2014 in the Republic of Austria.

Incumbents
 President: Heinz Fischer
 Chancellor: Werner Faymann

Governors
 Burgenland: Hans Niessl 
 Carinthia: Peter Kaiser
 Lower Austria: Erwin Pröll 
 Salzburg: Wilfried Haslauer Jr.
 Styria: Franz Voves 
 Tyrol: Günther Platter
 Upper Austria: Josef Pühringer
 Vienna: Michael Häupl 
 Vorarlberg: Markus Wallner

Events

May
 May 10 - Rise Like a Phoenix by Austrian singer Conchita Wurst wins the Eurovision Song Contest 2014.
 May 25 - European Parliament election, 2014

July
 July 23 - A football friendly in Austria between Israeli Maccabi Haifa F.C. and French team Lille OSC is abandoned after pro-Palestinian protesters storm the field and attack the players.

August
 August 26 - Michael Spindelegger resigns as vice-chancellor and finance minister of Austria; as leader of the Austrian People's Party, he is replaced by Reinhold Mitterlehner.

Sport

 2013–14 Austrian Football Bundesliga
 2013–14 Austrian Football First League
 2013–14 Austrian Cup
 2013–14 Austrian Hockey League season
 Austria at the 2014 Winter Olympics

References

 
Years of the 21st century in Austria
Austria
2010s in Austria
Austria